Choristocarpaceae is a family in the order Discosporangiales of the brown algae (class Phaeophyceae).  The family contains a single genus, Choristocarpus. The species is mostly located in the cold waters of the Northern hemisphere. A type of seaweed, Choristocarpaceae attaches itself to rocky substrate in places that are near continental shelves and the shore. Due to the species having morphological similarity, they were classified in closer relation with D. mesarthrocarpum. But due to many other differing characteristics Choristocarpaceae were put into their own family with a single genus and a single species of brown algae.

Description 
Choristocarpaceae vary a lot in their size as they can be as short as one meter, but grow to over fifty meters in their lifetime. The color of the species does not vary much, depicting a brown or clear color in most situations. The cells of Choristocarpaceae are strictly uniseriate, meaning that they are arranged in a single row or layer in the brown algae which is different from other brown algae which are multiseriate. Their cell walls are also different from others as in vitro experiments showed that they do not blacken due to the addition of bleach as other algae do. Their unseriate nature helps them in this way as a defense mechanism. As opposed to having many leaf-like structures, Choristocarpaceae have many nubs on the stipe of the species.

Distribution 
They are found in the rocky substrate of cold waters that stretch from polar areas of the ocean to more temperate areas. In the ocean they are found nearer to the surface, close to continental shelves. Choristocarpaceae are a relatively rare and unique species of brown algae that do not have many records of occurrence in the world.

Habitat and biology 
Choristocarpaceae are a photosynthetic species and their predominance of brown pigments give them their characteristic brown color. With their holdfasts they attach onto hard rocky structures and grow upwards. They are sessile organisms that generate energy through the process of photosynthesis. They also have air vesicles inside of them to keep them upright and maintain buoyancy.  They are eaten by a variety of species who do not eat the algae itself, but eat the various fragments that drift away from Choristocarpaceae in the water. Choristocarpaceae provide a habitat for fish and other species to live within and around. Reproduction happens via the use of spores and gametes that are released into the water column and then fertilize another member of their species that will start a new Choristocarpaceae that will eventually attach onto a hard substrate. Both asexual and sexual reproduction takes place. The species has an isomorphic life history with a  a haploid gametophyte and a diploid sporophyte.

Taxonomy 

Because they possessed uniseriate filamentous thalli with apical growth cells, Choristocarpaceae  were originally put in the same family as Discosporangiales. Due to factors such as their different vegetative filaments, Discosporangiales were entered into their own unique family and genus. Others have argued that Discosporangiales should be classified into the order Sphacelariales. Further DNA analysis dissuaded that theory from taking hold. It showed that Choristocarpaceae represent a separate lineage and are only distantly related to Sphacelariales. When doing a phylogenetic tree analysis it was further found that Choristocarpaceae should be placed in their own lineage separate from other brown algae. As a species, Choristocarpaceae may have evolved more recently in evolutionary history than their brown algae relatives, resulting in their taxonomic status.

References

Brown algae
Brown algae families
Monogeneric algae families